Phu Khat Wildlife Sanctuary is a wildlife sanctuary in Nakhon Thai District of Thailand's Phitsanulok Province.

Geography
The small streams are tributaries of the Khwae Noi River.

Topography
Landscape is covered by forested mountains, such as Khao Pha Pratu Miang >, Khao Ya Pook >, Phu Klang, Phu Khat >. The area is divided into 40% high slope mountain area (upper slopes, shallow valleys, mountain tops and deeply incised streams), 57% hill slope area (open slopes, midslope ridges and u-shaped valleys) and 3% plains.

Climate
Ton Sak Yai National park has a tropical savanna climate (Köppen climate classification category Aw), which is divided into three seasons. Rainy season is between June and October. Winter from November till February is very cold at night.

Flora
The sanctuary is located in Chat Trakan, Daeng, Lam Khwae Noi Fang Sai, Nam Phak and Noen Pheum forests of Nakhon Thai District of Phitsanulok Province.

Location

See also
 List of protected areas of Thailand
 List of Protected Areas Regional Offices of Thailand

References

Wildlife sanctuaries of Thailand
Geography of Phitsanulok province
Tourist attractions in Phitsanulok province
2017 establishments in Thailand
Protected areas established in 2017